Vasyl Vasylovych Popadyuk known as Vasyl Popadiuk (born in Lviv on January 16, 1966) is a Ukrainian musician, known as the "Ukrainian Paganini", violinist, pianist, founder of the band "PapaDuke", with whom he travels the world, playing music in world music styles, Latino, gypsy, and jazz. He knows how to play 15 musical instruments, and each of the musicians in the band also plays various musical instruments. He is also a composer. He is an honored artist of Ukraine since 2009.

Biography 
He was born into a family of artists.

Vasyl Popadiuk studied at the Kyiv specialized music school named after Mykola Lysenko from the age of seven he was trained in classical music. Then he entered the Tchaikovsky National Academy of Music of Ukraine, from where he moved to the correspondence department of the Lviv Academy of Music named after Lisenko.

He completed his military service in Kyiv in the song and dance ensemble, which constantly gave concerts for the liquidators of the Chernobyl accident. Later, doctors recommended Vasyl Popadyuk to change his place of residence in 1988 and he moved to work to Moscow. Here, in the "World Music Theater", under the direction of Volodymyr Nazarov, he managed to play ten new national instruments of the world and learned the art of reincarnation. In 1993 he returned to Kyiv, where he played in the ensemble "Hopak", collaborated with the State Gypsy Theater "Romans".

Since 1997, he has lived and worked in Toronto and Ottawa. He is married to the daughter of Ukrainian politician Stepan Khmara Solomiya and has three daughters, Moryan, Sofiyka and Katrusya. The family speaks Ukrainian.

In 2003, he participated in the television show "Big Musical Canadian Dream", where he competed with 15 thousand other violinists. In the final, she performed a Hutsul fantasy and took second place.

In May 2022, together with his band, Papaduke gave a concert at the Zoetic Theater in Canada.

On January 27, 2023, in the municipal auditorium "Paco de Lucía" in Alcalá de Henares offers a concert to raise funds dedicated to getting ambulances for Ukraine.

Concerts 
In April 2022 he participated in a concert in Regina (Canada) at the Conexus Arts Centre to benefit the Luhansk Children's Hospital.

References

External links 
 Web Vasyl Popadyuk

20th-century Ukrainian musicians
21st-century Ukrainian musicians

1966 births
Living people